"It's dangerous to go alone! Take this." is a quotation from the 1986 video game The Legend of Zelda for the Nintendo Entertainment System (NES). It is spoken by an unnamed old man, met in the cave at the start of the game, who gives the player-character Link a sword to aid his quest to defeat Ganon and rescue Princess Zelda. The quote has been referenced in video gaming and other media, has become an Internet meme, and has been established in pop culture.

Description
In 1986, Nintendo released the original The Legend of Zelda video game on the Nintendo Entertainment System. It opens with the protagonist, Link, entering a cave to meet an old man who offers him a wooden sword and says, "It's dangerous to go alone! Take this." The player is given no further explanation within the game world on how to progress. Series creator Shigeru Miyamoto thought it would be more enjoyable to play the game without any help.

Reception
The quote has spawned many variations, has been a popular image template, and has been adapted to many titles of website articles. IGN positioned it at #22 on its top 100 video game moments list, describing it as "one of the most-quoted video game sentences" and the best example of the exploration element of The Legend of Zelda. GamesRadar featured it in its list of the 40 most repeated video game quotes and of the top 100 best video game quotes. Sal Basile for UGO Networks included the quote in a list of "what we learned" from The Legend of Zelda. Ozzie Mejia for Shacknews opined that the quote "has become synonymous with gaming in the 35 years since they were first spoken. More than that, it's seeped into the greater world of pop culture. It's been referenced in other games, television, merchandise, memes, and much more". In 2021, GameSpot staff commented on the legacy of the quotation within the original The Legend of Zelda game by stating that "there's still nothing quite like wandering through its enormous, mysterious world, with barely a hint or explanation to lead you on. It was dangerous to go alone. No help was coming. No guideposts were set along the way. There was just you, your sword, the pull to explore, and a game that rewarded you with nothing but hours of discovery".

Other appearances
The website Ludum Dare hosted a 48-hour contest in 2011 wherein 352 game developers made a video game with the theme "It's Dangerous To Go Alone! Take This!".

The 2012 video game Adventure Time: Hey Ice King! Why'd You Steal Our Garbage?!! features the character Jake the Dog saying to fellow protagonist Finn the Human, "Hey, man! It's dangerous to go alone!" The game was developed in part as an homage to The Legend of Zelda series.

In Donkey Kong Country Returns 3D, a version of the quote appears on a barrel in Cranky Kong's shop and reads, "It's dangerous to go alone. Buy this!"

Nintendo used the quote in 2015 as a tagline for The Legend of Zelda: Tri Force Heroes, which features three different Links working together to save Hytopia Kingdom from a curse. Advertising for the game included the slogan, "It's dangerous to go alone...so don't".

The quotation appears as a hidden message in the 2017 game The Legend of Zelda: Breath of the Wild. Many messages within the game world are displayed on signs, walls, and books, written in Sheikah text which can be translated into English. The Sheikah Slate pins used by the player as beacons are translated to "it's dangerous to go alone".

Nintendo reiterated the original quote in advertising blurb for the limited edition Game & Watch: The Legend of Zelda unit, released in 2021, which includes versions of The Legend of Zelda, Zelda II: The Adventure of Link, and The Legend of Zelda: Link's Awakening. The quote was updated to read, "It's dangerous to go alone – take these!"

See also
 I am Error

Notes

References

Internet memes
1986 neologisms
The Legend of Zelda
Video game memes
Quotations from video games